Judith Hearne (later republished as The Lonely Passion of Judith Hearne), was regarded by Northern Irish-Canadian writer Brian Moore as his first novel. The book was published in 1955 after Moore had left Ireland and was living in Canada. It was rejected by 10 American publishers, then was accepted by a British publisher. Diana Athill's memoir Stet (2000) has information about the publishing of Judith Hearne.

Set in Belfast in the 1950s, Judith Hearne has been described as "a sensitive study of a middle-aged alcoholic woman in drab Belfast and her desperate last attempts at finding love and companionship". Ann Leary, reviewing the book for NPR, calls it "a short book about a lifetime of longing" and says "Moore uses brilliant economy in his writing; it's as if words are as scarce and precious as sunshine in this gloomy section of postwar Belfast". According to Colm Tóibín, the book "is full of Joycean moments... it takes from ‘Clay’, the most mysterious story in Dubliners, the idea of a single, middle-aged woman visiting a family and finding both comfort and humiliation there". Robert Fulford, writing in Canada's The Globe and Mail, describes it as "a bleak post-Catholic novel" that depicts "a desolate life, stripped of warming humanity".

Moore won the Authors' Club First Novel Award and the Beta Sigma Phi award for this work, although it was not his first novel.

A film based on the book, but with the story relocated to Dublin, was released in 1987 with Maggie Smith in the title role.

The book was republished by HarperCollins, under the title The Lonely Passion of Judith Hearne, on 16 July 2007 in the Harper Perennial Modern Classics series.

Critical reception

In November 2019, BBC Arts included Judith Hearne on its list of the 100 most influential novels.

Commenting in the Belfast Telegraph, writer Carlo Gébler stated: " [T]he author communicates her specificity (she is a lonely, damaged, needy, alcoholic, Catholic middle-aged woman who yearns for love) with enormous tenderness and precision." His technique, he added: "combines third person omniscient narrative with first person stream of consciousness material: by combining the two (and he does this deftly) Moore...tells his story and he allows us unfettered access to the private interior world of the people he is writing about."

References

1955 British novels
1955 Canadian novels
1955 debut novels
André Deutsch books
British television composers
Canadian novels adapted into films
Irish novels adapted into films
New Canadian Library
Novels by Brian Moore (novelist)
Novels set in Belfast